Yitzhak Gagula (born 1 January 1964) is a former Israeli politician who served as a member of the Knesset for Shas between 1999 and 2003.

Biography
Gagula was born Isaak Gagulashvili in the Georgian SSR in the Soviet Union and was educated at a yeshiva, Gagula made aliyah to Israel in 1972.

For the 1999 Knesset elections he was placed 18th on the Shas list. Although the party won only 17 seats, Gagula entered the Knesset at the start of the term as the party's top candidate, Aryeh Deri, resigned  due to a corruption trial.

He lost his seat in the 2003 elections.

References

External links
 

1964 births
Jews from Georgia (country)
Israeli people of Georgian-Jewish descent
Members of the 15th Knesset (1999–2003)
Living people
Shas politicians
Ono Academic College alumni
Soviet emigrants to Israel